Kang Ye-seo (born August 22, 2005), better known mononymously as Yeseo, is a South Korean singer and actress. She is best known for competing on the Mnet survival competition show Girls Planet 999 and ranking 6th in the final episode, making her a member of the group Kep1er. She is also a former member of the South Korean group CutieL and Busters as the vocalist. Kang began her acting career in 2010 in a supporting role in the MBC drama, Golden Fish.

Career
2010–2020: Early career beginnings, debut with Busters
Kang began her acting career in 2010 in a supporting role in the MBC drama, Golden Fish and at the same time, she became a member of the kid's girl group CutieL. She started gaining popularity in 2013 for acting in the film Miracle in Cell No. 7 as Choi Ji-yeon for her famous Sailor Moon backpack, which helped Sailor Moon gain domestic popularity in Korea. She then acted in almost 20 dramas.

Kang became a new member of Busters to replace Minjung towards the end of January. She made her debut on July 31, 2019, with their first extended play Pinky Promise. On August 6, 2020, Yeseo left the group to continue acting and other activities.

2021–present: Girls Planet 999 and Kep1er

On July 18, 2021, Kang was officially announced as a contestant in Mnet's survival show Girls Planet 999 where she represented 143 Entertainment alongside fellow Kep1er member Mashiro Sakamoto. On October 22, 2021, Yeseo placed 6th with a total of 770,561 points in the final episode thus making her included in final group lineup. On January 3, 2022, she officially debuted as a member of Kep1er with the release of their first EP, First Impact''.

Discography

Filmography

Film

Television series

Television shows

Notes

References 

2005 births
Living people
People from Incheon
Musicians from Incheon
South Korean female idols
K-pop singers
South Korean women pop singers
South Korean dance music singers
21st-century South Korean women singers
Girls Planet 999 contestants
Kep1er members
South Korean child actresses
South Korean television actresses
Reality show winners
Swing Entertainment artists